Richard Widcombe or Wydecombe (fl. 1413–1431) of Bath, Somerset, was an English politician.

He was a Member (MP) of the Parliament of England for Bath in May 1413, November 1414, 1419, 1420, May 1421, 1425, 1426, 1429 and 1431. He was Mayor of Bath in 1417–18, 1426–27 and 1428–29.

References

14th-century births
15th-century deaths
English MPs May 1413
Mayors of Bath, Somerset
English MPs November 1414
English MPs 1419
English MPs 1420
English MPs May 1421
English MPs 1425
English MPs 1426
English MPs 1429
English MPs 1431